Man of the Century is a 1999 American comedy film directed by Adam Abraham and written by Abraham and Gibson Frazier.  The film stars Frazier, Cara Buono, Susan Egan, Dwight Ewell and Anthony Rapp.  It is a farce about the attitudes, values, and slang displayed in the popular culture of the 1920s (and, to some extent, the early 1930s). Man of the Century was filmed in black and white. Its working title was "Johnny Twennies".

Characters 

The main characters include:
 Johnny Twennies – (Gibson Frazier) A lovable, good-looking, fast-talking newspaper reporter whose manner is similar to that of a 1920s pulp character.
 Virginia Clemens - (Cara Buono) A sweet girl who has an innocent school-girl crush on Johnny.
 Samantha Winter - (Susan Egan) Johnny's modern girlfriend.

References

External links
 
 

1999 films
American comedy films
1999 comedy films
1990s English-language films
1990s American films